Gemas railway station is a Malaysian railway station located at the eastern side of and named after the town of Gemas, Tampin District, Negeri Sembilan. Built in 1922, the station is the meeting point of and the railway junction connecting the West Coast Line (Padang Besar–Singapore) with the East Coast Line (Tumpat–Gemas).

As part of the Seremban–Gemas double tracking and electrification, the tracks were realigned and a new station building was built adjacent to the old station building. The old station building, platforms and a section of the railway tracks have been spared demolition and preserved.

History 
The original Gemas station was constructed sometime in 1922 as a hub for trains from Penang, Seremban, and Kuala Lumpur. The station also houses a railyard to store active motive power and rolling stock, the railyard also has another function as well: a scrapyard for old, broken down motive power and rolling stock to be scrapped off as cheap metal.

Its function as a junction between the West Coast railway line up to Padang Besar and East Coast railway line up to Tumpat made it very popular to passengers as trains will stop for a certain long period to transfer goods and passengers between both routes, before continuing their journey. Passenger intending to change trains between both routes also alighted here for their next train.

The old station was closed in 2015 as a new building next to it was build to accommodate electrifying of West Coast route and also the subsequent ETS extension, with the station became the southernmost station of electrified railway for the time being. The old station building was later converted as a hawker place and later parts of it converted into a railway museum.

KTM Komuter 
However, passengers to Kuala Lumpur, Batu Caves or Tanjung Malim are required to switch trains at Seremban then. Following a rescheduling exercise in June 2016 the shuttle service was cut short and ended at Pulau Sebang/Tampin, removing Gemas and Batang Melaka from the line. Direct trains all the way to Tanjung Malim (and later to Batu Caves) was established from Pulau Sebang/Tampin station and passengers were no longer required to change trains at Seremban. However, both Gemas and Batang Melaka were no longer included in the Seremban Line.

KTM ETS 
On 10 October 2015 KTM ETS services were extended to Gemas. The station remains the southernmost terminus of the service until the electrification and double tracking project of the Johor part of the railway is done.

Train services
 KTM ETS
 ETS Gold Train No. 9420/9425 Padang Besar–Gemas
 ETS Premium Train No. 9204/9371 Butterworth–Gemas
 KTM Intercity
 Ekspres Selatan  Train No. 40/42/44 JB Sentral–Gemas
 Ekspres Selatan  Train No. 41/43/45 Gemas–JB Sentral
 Ekspres Rakyat Timuran Train No. 26/27 Tumpat–JB Sentral

Gallery

References

External links 

KTM ETS railway stations
Railway stations opened in 1922
Railway stations in Negeri Sembilan